Alexander Konstantinovich Abramov (1836–1886) was a Russian major general. He was serving under general Mikhail Chernyayev during the time of Russia's conquest of Central Asia, Abramov is perhaps best known for leading the siege against the Uzbekistan city of Samarkand in 1868.

References 

Imperial Russian Army generals
Recipients of the Order of Saint Stanislaus (Russian)
1836 births
1886 deaths
Recipients of the Order of St. George of the Third Degree
19th-century military personnel from the Russian Empire
Russian nobility